Syd Hoare (18 July 1939 – 12 September  2017) was an English judoka who competed for Great Britain in the 1964 Summer Olympics. Hoare was also a silver medalist in the 1965 European Judo Championships.

References

External links
 

1939 births
2017 deaths
Olympic judoka of Great Britain
English male judoka
Judoka at the 1964 Summer Olympics
Sportspeople from London